Zhang Xin (also known as Xin Zhang and Xin "Shynn" Zhang, born 1965) is a Chinese billionaire businesswoman, having primarily earned her fortune in the real estate industry. With her husband Pan Shiyi, she is the co-founder and former CEO of SOHO China, a Chinese office building developer. She stepped down from the role of CEO on 7 September 2022 “in order to focus on supporting the arts and philanthropic pursuits.”

Raised in meager circumstances in Beijing and Hong Kong, where she was a factory worker for a time, Zhang eventually came to own companies responsible for dozens of real estate developments in Beijing and Shanghai. In the mid-2010s, Zhang began a transition from a business model of building and selling properties to one of buying and leasing them. Zhang also acquired large stakes in New York City's Park Avenue Plaza and General Motors Building, and launching the SOHO 3Q shared office space sector for this purpose in February 2015. In 2014, Zhang was listed as the 62nd most powerful woman in the world by Forbes, and is "regularly named one of the top businesswomen in the world." Zhang and her husband were also previously ranked by Forbes among the "world's most powerful couples." As one of China's best known female entrepreneurs, Zhang has an online following of 10 million on Sina Weibo, the Chinese equivalent of Twitter.

Zhang and Pan founded the SOHO China Foundation in 2005 as a philanthropic organization to engage in education focused initiatives to alleviate poverty. In 2014, the Foundation launched the SOHO China Scholarships to provide financial aid to Chinese undergraduate students at leading international universities. The SOHO China Scholarships support approximately 50 Chinese students pursuing undergraduate degrees at Harvard, Yale, and the University of Chicago.

Early life and education 
In the 1950s, Zhang Xin's parents, second generation Burmese Chinese, left Burma and immigrated to China. There, they worked as translators at the Foreign Languages Press. They separated during the Cultural Revolution.

Born in Beijing in 1965, Zhang remained with her mother after the separation of her parents, moving with her mother to Hong Kong at the age of 15, where they lived in a room just big enough for two bunk beds. To save for an education abroad, she worked for five years in small factories that made garment and electronic products. By the age of 19, she had saved enough for airfare to London and to support herself for English study at a secretarial school in Oxford. To support herself in the UK, she "worked in a traditional British fish and chip shop run by a Chinese couple," and took on Prime Minister Margaret Thatcher as a role model, while also developing a "fascination with left-wing British intellectuals."

In 1987, while still studying in London, she earned a scholarship that enabled her to begin studying economics at the University of Sussex, where she received a bachelor's degree. In 1992, she graduated with a master's degree in development economics from Cambridge University, where she wrote her master's thesis on privatization in China. In 2013, Zhang received an honorary doctorate from the University of Sussex.

Career

Initial investments
Upon graduation, Zhang was hired by Barings PLC (later Barings Bank), which had scouted Cambridge for students with knowledge of privatization in China, and which hired Zhang on the strength of her master's thesis on the topic. She returned to Hong Kong to work, but in 1993, her unit at Barings was acquired by Goldman Sachs, and Zhang was transferred to New York City, where she helped bring privatized Chinese factories to the public stock exchange. Intrigued by China's burgeoning urbanization, she returned to her hometown, Beijing, where she met and married her husband—who purportedly proposed just four days after they met, in 1994. In 1994, the couple began a mixed-use development project on unwanted land, called "New Town." 

She co-founded Hongshi (meaning Red Stone), which later became SOHO China, with her husband Pan Shiyi in 1995. Over the next decade, they began six additional development projects in China, including a residential development in Boao, on the island of Hainan, and the Commune by the Great Wall, a managed boutique hotel in Beijing featuring the works of twelve Asian architects recruited by Zhang. Early in their marriage and business relationship, the couple experienced friction due to differing ideas of how the business should be run, leading Zhang to return to England for a time to reflect. Eventually, she decided to return to her husband, but left the business for a time, returning to focus on the design end when business increased.

Later developments
Within 10 years after Zhang and Shiyi started their company, it was the largest property developer in the country, with Zhang known as "the woman who built Beijing". By 2008, the couple was described by The Times as "China's most visible and flamboyant property tycoons." In 2011, Zhang began to transition from merely developing and selling properties to buying and leasing space, and branched out of China by acquiring a $600 million stake in New York City's Park Avenue Plaza, followed by participation in a group acquiring a 40 percent stake in the General Motors Building in midtown Manhattan in 2014, for a reported $1.4 billion. By that time, Zhang, through SOHO China, was involved in 18 developments in Beijing and 11 in Shanghai. 

In 2014, Zhang and her husband launched a $100 million charitable initiative, the SOHO China Scholarships, "to fund disadvantaged Chinese students at top institutions across the globe," including gifts of over $10 million to Yale University, over $15 million to Harvard University, and $10 million to the University of Chicago; the gifts engendered some controversy among critics who felt that the money could have been spent improving schools in China. The SOHO China Scholarships support approximately 50 Chinese students pursuing undergraduate degrees at partner universities.

SOHO China began a transition from a business model of building and selling properties to one of buying and leasing them, with Zhang participating in the February 2015 launch of the SOHO 3Q shared office space sector, leasing shared space to companies in cities in China. 

Zhang moved to the United States during the COVID-19 pandemic and resigned from SOHO China in September 2022.

Recognition

Zhang has received international awards for her role as an architectural patron in China and as an entrepreneur. In 2002, she was awarded a special prize at the 8th la Biennale di Venezia for Commune by the Great Wall, a private collection of architecture, now a hotel.

Zhang is a member of World Economic Forum, Davos and a board member of the Harvard Global Advisory Council. She served as a trustee to the China Institute in America from 2005 to 2010, and was recognized by the China Institute with a Blue Cloud Award in 2010. In 2014, Zhang was listed as the 62nd most powerful woman in the world by Forbes. and is "regularly named one of the top businesswomen in the world." Zhang and her husband have also been ranked by Forbes among the "world's most powerful couples." Zhang has been named a trustee of the Museum of Modern Art and of the Asia Business Council.

Zhang made a cameo appearance, as a representative of a Chinese investor, in the 2010 film Wall Street: Money Never Sleeps.

Personal life 
Zhang and Pan have two sons. They are members of the Baháʼí Faith.

References

Further reading
 Gillet, Kit. "ZHANG XIN" (Archive). China International Business (CIB). January 2010 issue, 19 January 2010.

External links 

 "China's Billionaire Builder," Bloomberg Markets Magazine, 11 August 2010
 "How Religion Changes a Chinese Billionaire Developer", The Wall Street Journal, 6 March 2011
 

1965 births
Living people
SOHO China people
21st-century Bahá'ís
Alumni of the University of Sussex
Alumni of Wolfson College, Cambridge
Chinese Bahá'ís
Chinese women chief executives
Chinese real estate businesspeople
Converts to the Bahá'í Faith
Businesspeople from Beijing
Chinese people of Burmese descent
Female billionaires
Billionaires from Beijing
20th-century Chinese businesswomen
20th-century Chinese businesspeople
21st-century Chinese businesswomen
21st-century Chinese businesspeople
Chinese women company founders